The State Emblem of India is the national emblem of the Republic of India and is used by the union government, many state governments, and other government agencies. The emblem is an adaptation of the Lion Capital of Ashoka, an ancient sculpture dating back to 280 BCE during the Maurya Empire. The statue is a three dimensional emblem showing four 
lions. It became the emblem of the Dominion of India in December 1947, and later the emblem of the Republic of India. The State Emblem of India is an official seal of the Government of India. It is used as the national emblem of India and appears on official documents, currency and passports.

The emblem was adopted by the Government of India on January 26, 1950, the same day that India became a republic. It is based on the Lion Capital of Ashoka, a sculpture that was originally erected at the Sarnath, a place where Gautama Buddha first taught the Dharma, now in Uttar Pradesh, India. The emblem features four Asiatic lions standing back to back, symbolizing power, courage, confidence and faith. The lions are mounted on a circular abacus and the abacus is mounted on a lotus. The wheel of the law, Dharmachakra, is in the center of the abacus. The wheel has 24 spokes, which symbolize the progress and evolution of human civilization.

The motto "Satyameva Jayate" ("truth alone triumphs") is inscribed below the abacus in Devanagari script, which is written from left to right. The use of the emblem is governed by the State Emblem of India (Prohibition of Improper Use) Act, 2005 and the State Emblem of India (Regulation of Use) Rules, 2007.

The State Emblem of India is used by the Government of India and its agencies, as well as by all state governments and union territory administrations in India. It is also used by private citizens in India on letterheads, business cards and other personal uses, but with certain restrictions. The emblem is protected under the Indian Emblem Act and its use without proper authority is punishable under the law.

Overall, the State Emblem of India is a symbol of India's sovereignty and national pride, and it serves as an important national symbol of India's republic status and its secular and democratic principles.

History
Following the end of British rule on 15 August 1947, the newly independent Dominion of India adopted an official state emblem on 30 December 1947. The emblem consisted of a representation of the Lion Capital of Ashoka at Sarnath enclosed within a rectangular frame.<ref name="State Emblem and Seal...

That's why

The task of beautifying the original copy of the Constitution of India was given to Nandalal Bose (then the Principal of Kala Bhavan Shanti Niketan or Shanti Niketan) by the Indian National Congress. Bose set out to complete this task with the help of his students, one of whom was Dinanath Bhargava, then 21 years old. Bose was keen to include the Lion Capital of Ashoka into the opening pages of the constitution. Wanting the lions to be depicted realistically, he chose Bhargava who studied the behaviour of the lions at the Kolkata Zoo.

On 26 January 1950, a representation of the Lion Capital of Ashoka placed above the motto, was adopted as the State Emblem of India.Usage and description

The emblem forms a part of the official letterhead of the Government of India and appears on all Indian currency as well. It also functions as the national emblem of India in many places and appears prominently on Indian passports. Usage of the emblem is regulated and restricted under State Emblem of India (Prohibition of Improper Use) Act, 2005, under which no individual or private organisation is permitted to use the emblem for official correspondence. The Ashoka Chakra (Ashoka wheel) on its base features in the centre of the National Flag of India.

The actual Sarnath capital features four Asiatic lions standing back to back, symbolising power, courage, confidence and pride, mounted on a circular base. At the bottom is a horse and a bull, and at its centre is a Dharma chakra. The abacus is girded with a frieze of sculptures in high relief of The Lion of the North, The Horse of the West, The Bull of the South and The Elephant of the East, separated by intervening wheels, over a lotus in full bloom, exemplifying the fountainhead of life and creative inspiration. Carved from a single block of sandstone, the polished capital is crowned by the Wheel of Dharma.

In the emblem finally adopted, only three lions are visible, the fourth being hidden from view. The wheel appears in relief in the centre of the abacus, with a bull on the right and a galloping horse on the left, and outlines of Dharma Chakras on the extreme right and left. A horse and a bull are represented right below the abacus. The bull represents hard work and steadfastness, while the horse represents loyalty, speed, and energy. The bell-shaped lotus beneath the abacus has been omitted.

Forming an integral part of the emblem is the motto inscribed below the abacus in Devanagari script: Satyameva Jayate (lit. "Truth alone triumphs"). This is a quote from the Mundaka Upanishad'', the concluding part of the sacred Hindu Vedas.

Emblems of national bodies

Emblems of states and union territories 

Most of the states and union territories of India have adopted their own state emblem, seal or coat of arms which are used as an official governmental symbol, while six states and five union territories use the National Emblem of India with a text legend as their official governmental seal.

Some of the autonomous district councils established by the Sixth Schedule of the Constitution of India have also adopted an official emblem.

Historic seals and emblems

Medieval period in India

Pandya Dynasty

Vijayanagara Empire

Ahom Kingdom

Early modern era in India

Mughal Empire

Maratha Empire

Colonial India

British rule in India

Portuguese India

French India

Azad Hind

Dominion of India

See also
 Flag of India
 Jana Gana Mana
 Vande Mataram
 National symbols of India
 List of Indian state emblems
 List of Indian state symbols

References

India
 

India
India
India
India
Memorials to Ashoka